St. Claude is a neighborhood of the city of New Orleans.  A subdistrict of the Bywater District Area, its boundaries as defined by the City Planning Commission are: Law, Montegut and North Galvez Streets to the north, Lesseps Street to the east, Burgundy Street, Clouet Street and St. Claude Avenue to the south and Franklin Avenue to the west.

St. Claude is the location of the former Francis T. Nicholls High School, since renamed Frederick Douglass High School.

Geography

Adjacent neighborhoods
 Florida Area (north)
 Bywater (east & south)
 St. Roch (west)

Boundaries
The City Planning Commission defines the boundaries of St. Claude as these streets: Law Street, Montegut Street, North Galvez Street, Lesseps Street, Burgundy Street, Clouet Street, St. Claude Avenue and Franklin Avenue.

Demographics
As of the census of 2000, there were 11,721 people, 4,114 households, and 2,820 families residing in the neighborhood.  The population density was 11,491 /mi2 (4,508 /km2).

As of the census of 2010, there were 6,820 people, 2,713 households, and 1,546 families residing in the neighborhood.

See also
 New Orleans neighborhoods

References

Neighborhoods in New Orleans